Peter Harris (the elder) (died 3 May 1680) was a British buccaneer, one of the captains (along with Bartholomew Sharp and Edmund Cook) in the Pacific Adventure, a privateering expedition headed by Richard Sawkins and John Coxon.  After plundering the mining town of Santa Maria (east of Panama City) on 25 April 1680, the buccaneers set fire to the town and using canoes rowed downstream to the Pacific.  On 3 May the "expedition" reached  the port at Perico island off the coast of Panama City, finding there a Spanish fighting force of several barques and other ships. Although eventually victorious, the buccaneers lost twenty men, among them Captain Harris.
 
Another buccaneer called Peter Harris, apparently a nephew of the one mentioned above, was active in the same area during 1684–1685.

References

English pirates
Year of birth missing
1680 deaths